Torkandeh (also Romanized as Torkāndeh; also known as Turkanda) is a village in Sonbolabad Rural District, Soltaniyeh District, Abhar County, Zanjan Province, Iran. At the 2006 census, its population was 239, in 57 families.

References 

Populated places in Abhar County